The Maffra railway line is a closed railway line in Victoria, Australia. The line provided an alternative route to East Gippsland than the current route to Sale. The line was closed in stages from Traralgon to Cowwarr in 1986, and from Cowwarr to Maffra in 1994. In its latter years, the main purpose of the line was to serve dairy industries at Maffra.

The last passenger service from Traralgon to Maffra was run by a 153hp Walker railmotor on 7 July 1977. A replacement bus service started two days later. The last freight service on the line ran on 8 September 1994. It was an up goods to Sale, with locomotive N472 hauling a single container wagon and rail tractor RT49.

References

Closed regional railway lines in Victoria (Australia)
Railway lines closed in 1994
Railway lines opened in 1887
1887 establishments in Australia
1994 disestablishments in Australia
Transport in Gippsland (region)
City of Latrobe
Shire of Wellington